The Valdosta State University campus is divided into two areas: main campus, which houses much of the academic and administrative departments, and north campus, which primarily houses the Langdale College of Business.

Buildings on the Main Campus are modeled in Spanish Mission architecture using terra stucco construction and terra cotta roofs, and are surrounded by picturesque landscaping featuring palms, pines, azaleas, camelias and a mix of other beautiful flowering plants. It features an attractive pedestrian mall of inlaid brick and well-designed seating areas. The Rea and Lillian Steele North Campus is home to the Harley Langdale Jr. School of Business and Air Force ROTC Detachment 172, and is less than a mile north of VSU's main campus. The buildings follow a red brick modified form of Georgian architecture.

Main Campus

Residence Halls
VSU students can live in one of nine residence halls, all featuring the Spanish-Mission style architecture unique to main campus and each with its own individual interior style and atmosphere.

Satellite Facilities
Other units of the University are located in satellite facilities adjacent to the campus and along Patterson Street and provide homes for many other offices and programs for VSU. The campuses and principal satellite buildings are connected by the University bus service, operating regularly throughout each class day.

The Admissions Office
The Honors House
The Center for International Programs
The Women’s Studies Center in Carswell Hall,
The Regional Center for Continuing Education
The Psychology Classroom Building 
The Regional Center for Continuing Education
The Office of Equal Opportunity and Multicultural Affairs
The Bursary

The Rea and Lillian Steele North Campus

References

Valdosta State University campus
Valdosta
Valdosta State University